Tablat District is a district of Médéa Province, Algeria.

The district is further divided into four municipalities:
Tablat
Deux Bassins
Aissaouia
Mezerana

Districts of Médéa Province